William McNaught may refer to:
William McNaught (Glasgow) (1813–1881), Scottish engineer
William McNaught (Rochdale) (1811/1812-1888), English engineer
William McNaught (1883-1953), English music teacher and music critic (son of William Gray McNaught)
William Gray McNaught (1849–1918), English music teacher and music critic 
William Kirkpatrick McNaught (1845–1919), Canadian manufacturer and politician
Willie McNaught (born 1922), Scottish footballer